Rani Jhansi Marine National Park is located in the Andaman and Nicobar Islands in the Bay of Bengal. It was founded in 1996, and covers 256 km2. It commemorates Lakshmibai, the Rani of Jhansi (1828-58). It is located in the Ritchie's Archipelago and is about 30 km from Port Blair. It contains coral reefs and mangrove forests. The biggest attraction in the park is a fruit-eating bat. It plays a major role in the ecosystem, because it pollinates plants and scatters seeds.

References

 K K Gurung & Raj Singh: Field Guide to the Mammals of the Indian Subcontinent, Academic Press, San Diego, 
 Magnus Elander & Staffan Widstrand: Die schönsten Wildparks der Welt, Berg Verlag, 1994

External links
 Rani Jhansi Marine National Park; UNEP-WCMC

National parks in the Andaman and Nicobar Islands
Protected areas established in 1996
Marine parks of India
1996 establishments in the Andaman and Nicobar Islands